Ceroprepes nigrolineatella is a species of snout moth in the genus Ceroprepes. It was described by Shibuya in 1927, and is known from Japan and Taiwan.

References

Moths described in 1927
Phycitinae
Moths of Japan